(EF), formerly known as One Asia Foundation (OAF), is a non-profit organization founded in December 2009. Its headquarters are in Tokyo.

The organization's stated aim is increased international cooperation, with the goal of creating an international community of over 40 countries in Northeast Asia, Southeast Asia and Central Asia. It offers grants to universities and other institutions of higher educations that teach courses within areas such as regional integration.

Conventions 
Eurasia Foundation hosts annual conventions and invites special guests as keynote speakers annually since 2011.

Other collaborations 
The foundation collaborates with the Studies on Intermediality and Intercultural Mediation research group at the Complutense University of Madrid.

In 2016, the foundation awarded Dr Kevin Cawley of University College Cork $50,000 to open a course on Asian studies.

In February 2019, the foundation visited Amity University Haryana, where a 3 credit certificate course on One-Asian Community Theory was opened over a 14 week period for 45 students.

February 2020, The Center for Korean Studies at the University of Washington announced they were going to host a lecture series with the foundation's chairman giving a lecture titled, "The World Will Be United in the Near Future" starting on 16 April 2020. However, due to the pandemic, the lecture was cancelled.

Foundation Name Change 

In April 2020, the foundation officially changed their name to Eurasia Foundation (from Asia) after the expansion of activities in Europe and the Middle East with the vision to develop their activities globally.

References

External links 
 

Non-profit organizations based in Japan
2009 establishments in Japan
Organizations based in Tokyo
Organizations established in 2009